Tsuyoshi Shinchu (新中 剛史, born November 28, 1986) is a Japanese football player.

Club statistics
Updated to 23 February 2016.

References

External links

Profile at KUFC

1986 births
Living people
Biwako Seikei Sport College alumni
Association football people from Kagoshima Prefecture
Japanese footballers
J2 League players
J3 League players
Japan Football League players
Fagiano Okayama players
Matsumoto Yamaga FC players
Kagoshima United FC players
Association football midfielders